Leslie Charles Harding (3 August 1895 – 15 March 1979) was an Australian politician who represented the South Australian House of Assembly seat of Victoria from 1956 to 1965 for the Liberal and Country League.

References

 

1895 births
1979 deaths
Members of the South Australian House of Assembly
Liberal and Country League politicians
20th-century Australian politicians